Food Rules! The Stuff You Munch, Its Crunch, Its Punch, and Why You Sometimes Lose Your Lunch is a 2001 book by Bill Haduch, published by Dutton. It explains food and nutrition at the middle-school level, and was named to Booklist's Top Ten Youth Science Books of 2001.

The New York Times gave the book a favorable review.

References 

American non-fiction books
2001 children's books
Children's non-fiction books
Dutton Children's Books books
American children's books
Popular science books
Books about food and drink